Cherokee Nation v. Georgia, 30 U.S. (5 Pet.) 1 (1831), was a United States Supreme Court case. The Cherokee Nation sought a federal injunction against laws passed by the U.S. state of Georgia depriving them of rights within its boundaries, but the Supreme Court did not hear the case on its merits. It ruled that it had no original jurisdiction in the matter, as the Cherokees were a dependent nation, with a relationship to the United States like that of a "ward to its guardian," as said by Chief Justice Marshall.

Background

History 
The Cherokee people had lived in Georgia in what is now the southeastern United States for thousands of years.  In 1542, Hernando de Soto conducted an expedition through the southeastern United States and came into contact with at least three Cherokee villages.  The English immigrants to the Carolinas began to trade with the tribe beginning in 1673. By 1711, the English were providing guns to the Cherokees in exchange for their help in fighting the Tuscarora tribe in the Tuscarora War.  Cherokee trade with the English colonists of South Carolina and Georgia increased, and in the 1740s the Cherokee began to transition to a commercial hunting and farming lifestyle.  In 1775, one Cherokee village was described as having 100 houses, each with a garden, orchard, hothouse, and hog pens.  After a war with the colonists, the Cherokee signed a peace treaty in 1785.  In 1791 the Treaty of Holston was signed by Cherokee leaders and William Blount for the United States.

Cherokee Nation 
In the meantime, white settlers eager for new lands urged the removal of the Cherokee and the opening of their remaining lands to settlement, pursuant to the promise made by the United States in 1802 to the State of Georgia that Georgia did have a treaty with the Cherokee. President Thomas Jefferson also began to look at removing the tribe from their lands at this time.

Congress voted very small appropriations to support the removal, but policy changed under President James Monroe, who did not favor large-scale removal.  At the same time, the Cherokee were adopting some elements from European-American culture.  During this period until 1816, numerous other treaties were signed by the Cherokee. In each they ceded land to the United States and allowed for roads to be constructed through Cherokee territory, but also kept the terms of the Holston treaty.

In 1817, the Treaty of the Cherokee Agency began the start of the Indian removal era for the Cherokee. The treaty promised an "acre for acre" land trade, if the Cherokee would leave their homeland and move to areas west of the Mississippi River.  In 1819, the tribal government passed a law prohibiting any additional land cessions, providing for the death penalty for violation of the statute.  By the 1820s, most of the Cherokee had adopted a farming lifestyle similar to that of neighboring European Americans.

State of Georgia 
By 1823, the state government and citizens of Georgia began to agitate for the removal of the Cherokee Nation, in accordance with the agreements of 1802 with the federal government.  Congress responded by appropriating $30,000 to extinguish Cherokee title to land in Georgia.  In the fall of 1823, negotiators for the United States met with the Cherokee National Council at the tribe's capital city of New Echota, located in northwest Georgia.  Joseph McMinn, noted for being in favor of removal, led the U.S. delegation.  When the negotiations to remove the tribe did not go well, the U.S. delegation resorted to trying to bribe the tribe's leaders.

On December 20, 1828, the state legislature of Georgia, fearful that the United States would not enforce (as a matter of federal policy) the removal of the Cherokee people from their historic lands in the state, enacted a series of laws which stripped the Cherokee of their rights under the laws of the state.  They intended to force the Cherokee to leave the state. Andrew Jackson, who had long favored removal, was elected US president in 1828, taking office in 1829.  In this climate, John Ross, Principal Chief of the Cherokee Nation, led a delegation to Washington in January 1829 to resolve disputes over the failure of the US government to pay annuities to the Cherokee, and to seek federal enforcement of the boundary between the territory of the state of Georgia and the Cherokee Nation's historic tribal lands within that state. Rather than lead the delegation into futile negotiations with President Jackson, Ross wrote an immediate memorial to Congress, completely forgoing the customary correspondence and petitions to the President.

Ross found support in Congress from individuals in the National Republican Party, such as senators Henry Clay, Theodore Frelinghuysen, and Daniel Webster, as well as representatives Ambrose Spencer and David (Davy) Crockett. Despite this support, in April 1829, John H. Eaton, the secretary of war (1829–1831), informed Ross that President Jackson would support the right of Georgia to extend its laws over the Cherokee Nation.  In May 1830, Congress endorsed Jackson's policy of removal by passing the Indian Removal Act, which authorized the president to set aside lands west of the Mississippi River to exchange for the lands of Indian nations in the east.

When Ross and the Cherokee delegation failed to protect Cherokee lands through negotiation with the executive branch and through petitions to Congress, Ross challenged the actions of the federal government through the U.S. courts.

The case 
In June 1830, a delegation of Cherokee led by Chief John Ross (selected at the urging of Senators Daniel Webster and Theodore Frelinghuysen) and William Wirt, attorney general in the Monroe and Adams administrations, were selected to defend Cherokee rights before the U.S. Supreme Court.  The Cherokee Nation asked for an injunction, claiming that Georgia's state legislation had created laws that "go directly to annihilate the Cherokees as a political society." Georgia pushed hard to bring evidence that the Cherokee Nation couldn't sue as a "foreign" nation due to the fact that they did not have a constitution or a strong central government. Wirt argued that "the Cherokee Nation  [was] a foreign nation in the sense of our constitution and law" and was not subject to Georgia's jurisdiction.  Wirt asked the Supreme Court to void all Georgia laws extended over Cherokee lands on the grounds that they violated the U.S. Constitution, United States-Cherokee treaties, and United States intercourse laws.

The Court did hear the case but declined to rule on the merits. The Court determined that the framers of the Constitution did not really consider the Indian Tribes as foreign nations but more as "domestic dependent nation[s]" and consequently the Cherokee Nation lacked the standing to sue as a "foreign" nation. Chief Justice Marshall said; "The court has bestowed its best attention on this question, and, after mature deliberation, the majority is of the opinion that an Indian tribe or nation within the United States is not a foreign state in the sense of the constitution, and cannot maintain an action in the courts of the United States." The Court held open the possibility that it yet might rule in favor of the Cherokee "in a proper case with proper parties".

Chief Justice John Marshall wrote that "the relationship of the tribes to the United States resembles that of a 'ward to its guardian'." Justice William Johnson added that the "rules of nations" would regard "Indian tribes" as "nothing more than wandering hordes, held together only by ties of blood and habit, and having neither rules nor government beyond what is required in a savage state."

Justice Smith Thompson, in a dissenting judgment joined by Justice Joseph Story, held that the Cherokee nation was a "foreign state" in the sense that the Cherokee retained their "usages and customs and self-government" and the United States government had treated them as "competent to make a treaty or contract". The Court therefore had jurisdiction; Acts passed by the State of Georgia were "repugnant to the treaties with the Cherokees" and directly in violation of a congressional Act of 1802; and the injury to the Cherokee was severe enough to justify an injunction against the further execution of the state laws.

Aftermath 
One year later, however, in Worcester v. Georgia, 31 U.S. 515 (1832), the U.S. Supreme Court ruled that the Cherokee Nation was sovereign. According to the decision rendered by Chief Justice John Marshall, this meant that Georgia had no rights to enforce state laws in its territory.

President Andrew Jackson decided not to uphold the ruling of this case, and directed the expulsion of the Cherokee Nation. U.S. Army forces were used in some cases to round them up. Their expulsion and subsequent route is called "The Trail of Tears." Of the 15,000 who left, 4,000 died on the journey to "Indian Territory" in the present-day U.S. state of Oklahoma.

See also 
 List of United States Supreme Court cases, volume 30
 Worcester v. Georgia
Tribal Sovereignty in the United States

Notes

References

Bibliography

Further reading 
Anton-Herman Chroust, "Did President Andrew Jackson Actually Threaten the Supreme Court of the United States with Non-enforcement of Its Injunction Against the State of Georgia?," 4 Am. J. Legal Hist. 77 (1960).
Kenneth W. Treacy, "Another View on Wirt in Cherokee Nation", 5 Am. J. Legal Hist. 385 (1961).
Cherokee Nation Vs. The State Of Georgia 	(2009): 1. MasterFILE Premier. Web. 20 February  2012.
Cherokee Nation v. Georgia. Great American Court Cases. Ed. Mark Mikula and L. 	Mpho Mabunda. Vol. 4: Business and Government. Detroit: Gale, 1999. Gale 	Opposing Viewpoints In Context. Web. 20 February  2012.

External links

 
 Cherokee Nation v. Georgia case brief summary
Cherokee Nation historical marker

United States court cases involving the Cherokee Nation
1831 in United States case law
United States Supreme Court cases
United States Native American case law
Aboriginal title case law in the United States
United States Eleventh Amendment case law
United States Supreme Court original jurisdiction cases
Legal history of Georgia (U.S. state)
History of Georgia (U.S. state)
1831 in Georgia (U.S. state)
Trail of Tears
United States Supreme Court cases of the Marshall Court
March 1831 events
Native American history of Georgia (U.S. state)